Nizhnesyuryubayevo (Tübänge Sirbay) is a rural locality (a village) in Maxyutovsky Selsoviet, Kugarchinsky District, Bashkortostan, Russia. The population was 1 as of 2010. There is 1 street.

Geography 
Nizhnesyuryubayevo is located 43 km south of Mrakovo (the district's administrative centre) by road. Verkhnemursalyayevo is the nearest rural locality.

References 

Rural localities in Kugarchinsky District